Conch Key is an island and unincorporated community in Monroe County, Florida, United States, located in the middle Florida Keys. U.S. 1 (the Overseas Highway) crosses the key at approximately mile markers 62–63, between Long and Duck Keys. It is part of the census-designated place of Duck Key.

Little Conch Key, near mile marker 62.2, is also known as Walker's Island.

Geography

Education
It is in the Monroe County School District. It is zoned to Stanley Switick Elementary School (K-8) in Marathon.

References

Unincorporated communities in Monroe County, Florida
Unincorporated communities in Florida
Populated coastal places in Florida on the Atlantic Ocean